Luis Felipe Juárez (born February 6, 1990), nicknamed "El Pepón" is a Mexican professional baseball first baseman for the Leones de Yucatán of the Mexican League. He has previously played for the Sultanes de Monterrey of the Mexican League. He was selected Mexico national baseball team at 2017 World Baseball Classic, 2019 Pan American Games Qualifier, and 2019 exhibition games against Japan.

Career
On April 3, 2009, Juárez signed with the Sultanes de Monterrey of the Mexican League. After 8 seasons with the club, he became a free agent, but re-signed with the team on March 30, 2017. On December 21, 2017, Juárez was traded alongside Walter Ibarra to the Leones de Yucatán in exchange for Francisco Lugo and Ricky Alvarez. Juárez did not play in a game in 2020 due to the cancellation of the Mexican League season because of the COVID-19 pandemic.

References

External links

1990 births
Living people
Águilas de Mexicali players
Baseball players from Sinaloa
Leones de Yucatán players
Mexican League baseball catchers
Mexican League baseball first basemen
Mexican League baseball left fielders
Sportspeople from Culiacán
Sultanes de Monterrey players
2017 World Baseball Classic players